1397 Umtata, provisional designation , is an asteroid from the background population of the asteroid belt's central region, approximately 21 kilometers in diameter. It was discovered by South-African astronomer Cyril Jackson at the Union Observatory in Johannesburg on 9 August 1936. The asteroid was named after the South-African town of Mthatha, formerly known as Umtata.

Orbit and classification 

Umtata is a non-family asteroid of the main belt's background population. It orbits the Sun in the central asteroid belt at a distance of 2.0–3.4 AU once every 4 years and 5 months (1,603 days). Its orbit has an eccentricity of 0.26 and an inclination of 4° with respect to the ecliptic.

The body's observation arc begins with its official discovery observation at Johannesburg.

Physical characteristics 

The asteroid's spectral type is unknown. The Lightcurve Data Base assumes an S- or C-type to be equally likely, using an average albedo of 0.10 (see below).

Rotation period 

In May 1984, a rotational lightcurve of Umtata was obtained from photometric observations by American astronomer Richard Binzel. Analysis of the fragmentary lightcurve gave a rotation period of 30 hours with a brightness amplitude of 0.13 magnitude. As of 2017, no secure period has been obtained.

Diameter and albedo 

According to the surveys carried out by the Japanese Akari satellite and the NEOWISE mission of NASA's Wide-field Infrared Survey Explorer, Umtata measures between 20.35 and 22.895 kilometers in diameter and its surface has an albedo between 0.0794 and 0.112.

The Collaborative Asteroid Lightcurve Link assumes an albedo of 0.10 – a compromise value between the stony (0.20) and carbonaceous asteroid's, both abundant in the main belt's central region – and derives a diameter of 20.40 kilometers based on an absolute magnitude of 11.57.

Naming 

This minor planet was named after South-African town of Mthatha, formerly known as Umtata. It is the capital town of the OR Tambo District Municipality and the King Sabata Dalindyebo Local Municipality. The official  was published by the Minor Planet Center in April 1953.

Notes

References

External links 
 Asteroid Lightcurve Database (LCDB), query form (info )
 Dictionary of Minor Planet Names, Google books
 Asteroids and comets rotation curves, CdR – Observatoire de Genève, Raoul Behrend
 Discovery Circumstances: Numbered Minor Planets (1)-(5000) – Minor Planet Center
 
 

001397
Discoveries by Cyril Jackson (astronomer)
Named minor planets
19360809